Igmas is a rural locality (a settlement) and the administrative center of Igmasskoye Rural Settlement, Nyuksensky District, Vologda Oblast, Russia. The population was 866 as of 2002. There are 6 streets.

Geography 
Igmas is located 45 km southwest of Nyuksenitsa (the district's administrative centre) by road. Kirillovo is the nearest rural locality.

References 

Rural localities in Nyuksensky District